Nitta Yuma is a census-designated place and unincorporated community located in Sharkey County, Mississippi, United States. Nitta Yuma is located along U.S. Route 61, approximately four miles north of Anguilla.

The name "Nitta Yuma" is derived from the Choctaw language.

It was first named as a CDP in the 2020 Census which listed a population of 8.

Demographics

2020 census

Note: the US Census treats Hispanic/Latino as an ethnic category. This table excludes Latinos from the racial categories and assigns them to a separate category. Hispanics/Latinos can be of any race.

Climate
The climate in this area is characterized by relatively high temperatures and evenly distributed precipitation throughout the year.  According to the Köppen Climate Classification system, Nitta Yuma has a Humid subtropical climate, abbreviated "Cfa" on climate maps.

Education
It is a part of the South Delta School District, which operates South Delta High School.

Gallery

References

External links
More recent pictures of Nitta Yuma, Mississippi

Unincorporated communities in Sharkey County, Mississippi
Unincorporated communities in Mississippi
Census-designated places in Sharkey County, Mississippi
Mississippi placenames of Native American origin